This article is about the 2007 season of Hull Kingston Rovers.

Super League XII table

1Bradford deducted 2 points for breaching of salary cap rules.

2Wigan deducted 4 points for breaching salary cap rules.

2007 Season players

 
|}

2007 Signings/Transfers
Gains

Outs

References

Hull Kingston Rovers seasons
Hull Kingston Rovers season
2000s in Kingston upon Hull